"En attendant la fin" (Waiting for the end) is a song performed by French singer M. Pokora. It was written and produced by Olivier Reine.  It serves as the third single from Pokora's fourth studio album Mise à jour. It was released on October 17, 2011.

Music video 
The video was released on YouTube on November 22, 2011. It was filmed in the "black and white" format.

Chart performance 
"En attendant la fin" peaked at number 24 on the French Singles Chart.

Charts

Notes

2011 singles
M. Pokora songs
2011 songs